Michael Paterson (born 9 May 1985) is a rugby union player for the Northampton Saints in the Aviva Premiership. Previously he played for the Cardiff Blues in the Pro12 league. He plays as a lock or blindside flanker.  Paterson has represented the New Zealand under 21s but is yet to gain a cap for the All Blacks.  Before moving to Cardiff, Paterson was considered by many to be a strong contender to join the New Zealand squad.

Patterson joined Northampton Saints for the 2015/16 season where he has been a key player for the first team and made few appearances for the Saints' second team, Northampton Wanderers.

The lock has since racked up 36 appearances in a Saints shirt and most recently helped the Wanderers secure the Aviva 'A' League title, as the side beat Gloucester United at Franklin's Gardens and lifted the trophy.

International career
Having completed three years residency at the beginning of the 2012–13 Pro12 season, Paterson became eligible to play for Wales. Eligible to play for England, through an English grandfather, Paterson was selected for the England squad to face the Barbarians in the summer of 2014.

References

External links
Crusaders profile
Cardiff Blues Squad Profile

1985 births
Living people
Hurricanes (rugby union) players
New Zealand rugby union players
Cardiff Rugby players
Rugby union locks
Crusaders (rugby union) players
Canterbury rugby union players
Sale Sharks players
Northampton Saints players
Rugby union players from Christchurch
New Zealand people of English descent
New Zealand expatriate sportspeople in Wales